
Gmina Pieniężno is an urban-rural gmina (administrative district) in Braniewo County, Warmian-Masurian Voivodeship, in northern Poland.

Villages
Apart from the town of Pieniężno, Gmina Pieniężno contains the villages and settlements of Białczyn, Bornity, Borowiec, Brzostki, Cieszęta, Gajle, Gaudyny, Glądy, Glebiska, Jesionowo, Jeziorko, Kajnity, Kierpajny Małe, Kierpajny Wielkie, Kiersiny, Kolonia, Kowale, Łajsy, Lechowo, Łoźnik, Lubianka, Niedbałki, Pajtuny, Pakosze, Pawły, Pełty, Pieniężno Drugie, Pieniężno Pierwsze, Piotrowiec, Pluty, Posady, Radziejewo, Różaniec, Sawity, Wojnity, Wopy, Wyrębiska and Żugienie.

Neighbouring gminas
Gmina Pieniężno is bordered by the gminas of Braniewo, Górowo Iławeckie, Lelkowo, Lidzbark Warmiński, Orneta and Płoskinia.

References
Polish official population figures 2006

Pieniezno
Braniewo County